Cruzeiro Esporte Clube is a Brazilian multisport club based in Belo Horizonte, Minas Gerais state.

Cruzeiro Esporte Clube may also refer to:

Cruzeiro Esporte Clube (PB), Brazilian football club based in Itaporanga, Paraíba state
Cruzeiro Esporte Clube (RO), Brazilian football club based in Porto Velho, Rondônia state

See also
Esporte Clube Cruzeiro, Brazilian football club based in Porto Alegre, Rio Grande do Sul state